Antonee Burke-Gilroy (born 3 October 1997) is an English-born Australian association football player who plays for A-League club Perth Glory.

Career
Burke-Gilroy played with Newcastle Jets as well as spending 6-months on loan with Portuguese side Académica.

Burke-Gilroy signed with United Soccer League side Seattle Sounders FC 2 on 1 May 2018.

Burke-Gilroy played for Tacoma Defiance in the USL Championship.

References

External links

1997 births
Living people
Association football midfielders
Australian soccer players
Australian expatriate soccer players
Expatriate soccer players in the United States
USL Championship players
Australian expatriate sportspeople in the United States
Australian expatriate sportspeople in Portugal
Expatriate footballers in Portugal
Newcastle Jets FC players
Associação Académica de Coimbra – O.A.F. players
Tacoma Defiance players
Altona Magic SC players
Brisbane Roar FC players
Perth Glory FC players